USS Kanawha (AOG-31) was a T1-M-A2  acquired by the U.S. Navy for the dangerous task of transporting gasoline to warships in the fleet, and to remote Navy stations.

The fourth ship to be named Kanawha by the Navy, AOG-31 was laid down 30 August 1944 by the East Coast Shipyard, Inc., Bayonne, New Jersey, under a Maritime Commission contract; launched 18 October 1944; sponsored by Mrs. May T. Norton; transferred to the Navy 13 November; and commissioned 23 November 1944.

World War II service 
 
Following shakedown in Chesapeake Bay, Kanawha cleared Norfolk, Virginia, 15 January 1945 to load oil at Aruba, Netherlands West Indies, and arrived San Pedro, California, 13 February.

Pacific Fleet operations 

She arrived Pearl Harbor 20 March and departed 6 April with a cargo of lube oil, arriving Eniwetok 2 weeks later. Kanawha continued fueling services in the Marshalls and Marianas until she departed Ulithi 7 June with a cargo of lube oil for the Philippines and arrived Leyte 11 June. The tanker operated in the Philippines for the rest of the war and began similar duties at Okinawa 6 October.

Post-war decommissioning 

Kanawha sailed for America 14 November and arrived Mare Island, California, 14 December via Pearl Harbor. She decommissioned 23 March 1946 and was transferred to the War Shipping Administration (WSA) August 1946. She entered the National Defense Reserve Fleet at Suisun Bay, California, 4 September. She was sold for scrapping 2 March 1964.  Final disposition: scrapped, 1964.

References

External links 
 NavSource Online: Service Ship Photo Archive - AOG-31 Kanawha

 

Mettawee-class gasoline tankers
Type T1-M-A2 tankers of the United States Navy
Ships built in Bayonne, New Jersey
1944 ships
World War II auxiliary ships of the United States